Here I Am is the thirteenth and last album of Blue System. It was published in 1997 by BMG Ariola and was produced by Dieter Bohlen. The album contains 11 new tracks. 
There were two single releases: "Anything" (November 1997) and "Love Will Drive Me Crazy" (January 1998).

Track listing

Charts

External links

Blue System albums
1997 albums
Bertelsmann Music Group albums
Hansa Records albums